The Last Hurrah is a 1977 American made-for-television political drama film based on the 1956 novel The Last Hurrah, by Edwin O'Connor, and starring Carroll O'Connor. It was directed by Vincent Sherman and originally aired on NBC as a presentation of Hallmark Hall of Fame on November 16, 1977.

The novel was previously adapted for a 1958 film of the same title, starring Spencer Tracy.

Plot
A big-city mayor, Frank Skeffington, runs a powerful political machine as he seeks a fourth term, but his age, health, and unhappy adversaries all stand in his way.

Cast
 Carroll O'Connor as Frank Skeffington
 Patrick O'Neal as Norman Cass
 Dana Andrews as Roger Shanley
 Mariette Hartley as Clare Gardiner
 Jack Carter as Sam Weinberg
 Burgess Meredith as Cardinal Burke

External links

 

1977 television films
1977 films
1970s political drama films
American political drama films
Films based on American novels
Films set in Massachusetts
Films about elections
Films directed by Vincent Sherman
Hallmark Hall of Fame episodes
Television remakes of films
1970s English-language films
1970s American films